Qianaphaenops is a genus of beetles in the family Carabidae, containing the following species:

 Qianaphaenops longicornis Ueno, 2000
 Qianaphaenops pilosus Ueno, 2000
 Qianaphaenops rotundicollis Ueno, 2000
 Qianaphaenops tenuis Ueno, 2000

References

Trechinae